Gentioux-Pigerolles is a commune in the Creuse department in the Nouvelle-Aquitaine region in central France.

Geography
The commune is in the national park of the Millevaches (1000 lakes, not cows).

Population

Sights

 The three 12th-century churches at Gentioux, Pallier and Pigerolles.
A dolmen.
 A Roman bridge over the Thaurion at Senoueix.

 War memorial: after World War I, some towns in France set up pacifist war memorials. Instead of commemorating the glorious dead, these memorials denounce war with figures of grieving widows and children rather than soldiers. Such memorials provoked anger among veterans and the military in general. The most famous one is located in Gentioux. Below the column which lists the name of the fallen, stands an orphan in bronze pointing to an inscription ‘Maudite soit la guerre’ (war be damned). Feelings ran so high that the memorial was not officially inaugurated until 1990 and soldiers at the nearby army camp were under orders to turn their heads when they walked past.
 An 18th-century house at Pallier, once owned by the notary royal.
 The chapel of Villemoneix, dating from the 18th century.

Gallery

See also
Communes of the Creuse department

References

External links

Website  Of the Ski Association of Pigerolles 

Communes of Creuse